The 2015-16 Turkish Women's Basketball League is the 36th edition of the top-flight professional women's basketball league in Turkey.

League Champions
Fenerbahçe are the champions, beating Hatay BŞB in the play-off finals, by 3-0.

Regular season

League table

Results

Play-off

References

Turkish Women's Basketball League seasons
Women
Turkey